Diathrausta semilunalis is a moth in the family Crambidae. It was described by Koen V. N. Maes in 2006. It is found in the Democratic Republic of the Congo (Katanga) and South Africa (Mpumalanga, KwaZulu-Natal, Limpopo, Gauteng).

References

Moths described in 2006
Spilomelinae